Spotted piranha can refer to either of 2 species of these fish:

 Serrasalmus maculatus (literally meaning "spotted pirambeba")
 Serrasalmus rhombeus (redeye piranha)

Piranhas